America's Test Kitchen: The Next Generation is an American cooking competition television series hosted by Jeannie Mai Jenkins. It premiered on Amazon Freevee on December 9, 2022.

Summary
The series follows 11 home chefs who present their dishes through a series of challenges testing their culinary abilities and personalities. Each episode, the contestants stand before the judges' panel of America's Test Kitchen alums Dan Souza, Elle Simone, Jack Bishop, and Julia Collin Davison, as well as guest judges including Claudette Zepeda, Gesine Bullock-Prado, Jamie Bissonnette, Karen Akunowicz, Kwame Onwuachi, and Nick DiGiovanni. The last cook standing earns a starring role as a new host of America's Test Kitchen, as well as a $100,000 prize to fund their own culinary business, and the opportunity to write their own cookbook.

Contestants

 Antoinette Johnson
 Basil Maqbool
 Brooke Baevsky
 Christina Phan
 Corrina Sepulveda
 Garrett Schlichte
 Jessica Lawson
 Marc Sievers
 Peter Cardoz 
 Rachmi Primlani
 Robbie Guevarra

Production
On May 2, 2022, it was reported that America's Test Kitchen: The Next Generation would be a new unscripted competition series for Amazon Freevee, a spinoff of long-running PBS cooking show America's Test Kitchen. On October 18, 2022, it was announced that Jeannie Mai Jenkins, former co-host of talk show The Real, would host the series. Teri Weideman is the series' showrunner.

Release
The trailer for the series was released on November 10, 2022. The first episode of the 10-episode first season of the premiered on Amazon Freevee on December 9, 2022, with a new episode every week through February 10, 2023.

References

External links 
 

English-language television shows
2022 American television series debuts
2020s American cooking television series
Cooking competitions in the United States